Na'od was Emperor of Ethiopia from 1494 to 31 July 1508, and a member of the Solomonic dynasty. His reign was marked by internal tension between territories with the assistance of Queen Eleni. He began construct an extravagant church in Amhara province, called Mekane Selassie. The church was completed by his successor Dawit II in 1530.

Reign
Na'od was the second son of Baeda Maryam I and his second wife Kalyupe (also called "Calliope"), and was born at Gabarge.

Like Eskender before him, he relied on the counsel of the Queen Mother Eleni. Despite her help, his reign was marked by internal dissension.

Na'od was very talented in Amharic and Ge'ez poetry. He was also a notable author who wrote a number of religious books.

Na'od began construction on a lavish church in the Amhara province, which was decorated with gold leaf and known as Mekane Selassie. However, he died before it was completed, and he was buried in a tomb inside the church. His son Emperor Lebna Dengel completed the construction in 1530. Francisco Álvares records seeing the church as it was being constructed, and mentions that he was kept from entering it by the local clergy. However, not long after its completion, Imam Ahmad ibn Ibrahim al-Ghazi (also known as Ahmad Gurey/Gragn) penetrated the Amhara province, and on 3 November 1531, pillaged the structure and set it afire.

Emperor Na'od was killed by Imam Mafuz of the Adal Sultanate in battle.

Military career
The defence of the Empire was very strong during the reign of Na'od as he scored many victories over the Muslims.

G.W.B Huntingford claims that Na'od was killed near Jejeno (possibly Mekane Selassie) while campaigning against Muslim forces.

Taddesse Tamrat states that Na'od died on his way to repulse a Muslim raid in the eastern provinces.

Family
Na'od had five sons:
 Lebna Dengel – Succeeded Na'od as Emperor of Ethiopia
 Victor – Half-brother of Lebna Dengel, was slain in battle
 Jacob – Predeceased Na'od
 Claudius
 Minas

Notes

15th-century births
1508 deaths
15th-century emperors of Ethiopia
16th-century emperors of Ethiopia
15th-century monarchs in Africa
16th-century monarchs in Africa
Emperors of Ethiopia
Monarchs killed in action
Year of birth unknown